Kay Bennett is a fictional character from the NBC/DirecTV soap opera Passions. Kay was introduced as a character in 1999 and has been played by Taylor Anne Mountz (July 5, 1999 – August 2, 2000), Deanna Wright (September 25, 2000—October 6, 2003), and Heidi Mueller (October 24, 2003—August 7, 2008). She was also played temporarily by Gina Marie May (August 3 – September 20, 2000) while producers searched for a replacement for Mountz. Stephanie Patton also portrayed a nine-year-old Kay in various flashbacks in 2003. In addition, Molly Stanton portrayed the role sporadically from 2000 to 2002 when Kay masqueraded as her cousin, Charity Standish.

Character history 

Kay is the middle Bennett child. She refuses to get along with her sister, teasing her constantly. She developed a crush on her friend Miguel, and she uses her best friend, Simone, and his best friend Reese, to try to get closer to him. His growing relationship with Charity is a threat to her, so Kay has been doing everything she can to get rid of Charity, aware she is her cousin. When Simone suggested that Charity's long-lost aunt might be her mother's sister, Kay did everything she could to make sure that the two never met— her crush on Miguel proved to be more important to her than her mother's happiness.

Although she pretended to support Charity and Miguel, she was really trying to keep them apart.

Kay was lucky enough to escape from the bowels of Hell and get her soul back, but her flirtation with goodness didn't last too long before she found the Book of Spells, and cast a spell to entomb Charity in a block of ice, and created a Zombie Charity to aid her in getting Miguel. Things seemed to be going okay, until Zombie Charity developed a mind of her own, and developed her own agenda.

While her plan has always been to get Miguel at all costs, even Kay isn't heartless enough to want her family dead to get what she wants. Zombie Charity has been threatening not only Miguel, but also Grace, and Kay tried her best to convince Zombie Charity not to kill any of her loved ones.

Zombie Charity was defeated, but not before Kay committed the ultimate betrayal, she used Charity's essence to make Miguel think she was her cousin, then seduced him. Miguel was horrified and disgusted upon learning that he had actually slept with Kay, because he had no idea it was her.

Kay watched the man she was in love with made plans to marry her cousin, and sought to destroy them at all times by threatening to tell Charity, even though Eve said it would be dangerous for her to know the truth. She also continued her verbal attacks on her mother, who would not support Kay in her schemes to destroy Miguel and Charity's relationship. On Charity and Miguel's wedding day, Kay fainted at the Church, and everyone was shocked to learn Kay was pregnant.

Kay was thrilled that her condition resulted in the wedding being postponed, and despite Miguel informing everyone that he never would have gone near her, Kay told everyone that Miguel was meant to be hers. She is basing everything on something Miguel said once in the mine shaft, which is that if Charity never came to town, he may have asked her out. Recently she vowed to move out of the house after her mother gave her a choice. Kay left in the middle of a blizzard, putting both herself and her unborn child at risk.

Kay finally ended up at Tabitha's and blackmailed Tabitha into letting her live with her. Once she learned that Ivy and David were lying to Grace and Sam, rather than tell her parents the truth (no longer having any loyalty to her mother; in Kay's eyes Grace never loved or cared about her and she wanted to get revenge on her mother) she immediately began using it to her advantage, holding it over her mother's head whenever her mother wouldn't help her in her schemes to get Miguel. Miguel is now wary of her after getting a glimpse of her dark side, and he is more in love with Charity than ever, even though Kay has just given birth to his daughter.

The baby's life was in jeopardy numerous times, but it didn't stop Kay from continuing her scheming. She even used her daughter's health crises in an attempt to manipulate Miguel away from Charity. When her niece Sarah died Kay didn't care about the baby or her half-brother Ethan, only how she could use it to get to Miguel.

Kay continued to pursue Miguel, thrilled when they seemed to break up after Miguel caught Charity with Reese. Once she realized that Miguel was still dreaming about Charity and had no interest in her, she began plotting again full-force with Tabitha. Tabitha put a spell on Kay that turned her into a dog, and in that form, Kay (unwilling) went after Charity in Castleton, nearly killing her. When Miguel, trying to save Charity, speared the dog, it turned back into Kay, leading Miguel to believe he had accidentally speared Kay and not the dog. In the aftermath, Kay learned that due to the intensive medical damage, she could never have more children. When Miguel still refused to give up his love for Charity, Kay railed at him, blaming him for everything that had ever gone wrong in her life. It didn't make a difference, Miguel still left Harmony.

After Miguel left Harmony, Kay began to turn her life around. Although still living with Tabitha, Kay worked double shifts at the cannery to support herself and her baby daughter, and began to become a responsible adult. She started realizing all of the things she had done wrong over the years, and although she did not confess the details, apologized to her father and sister for everything that had happened. With Miguel out of Harmony, Kay fell in love with the rich Crane heir Fox Crane during a tsunami that hit Harmony. The two moved into Tabitha's house. Kay had briefly tutored under Tabitha to learn magic, but her powers never really surfaced. After a Cinderella-esque romance, Kay and Fox became engaged.

Kay's storyline soon shifted to her struggle to remain faithful to Fox. Ivy Winthrop, Fox's overbearing mother, was able to trick Miguel into returning to Harmony. Ivy, due to Theresa's betrayal of her favorite son Ethan Winthrop, is distrustful of most women who become interested in her sons. Ivy is particularly hostile towards Kay because Kay knows Ivy's darkest secret – that Ivy had blackmailed David Hastings into pretending to be Kay's mother, Grace's first husband so Ivy could get Kay's father Sam, her first love, back. Kay, who thought she had overcome her feelings for Miguel, soon realized that her old feelings were resurfacing. However, Kay refused to be with Miguel even after he declared that he had given up on Charity and wanted to be a family with Kay and Maria.

Kay was dealing with her jealousy over Miguel's relationship with Siren, a mermaid-turned-human. However, Endora zapped Siren into a fish tank after Fox complained that she was complicating his relationship with Kay. Despite the chaos regarding Fox and Miguel, Kay married Fox on January 10, 2007. Fox lied that he had a terminal illness to get Kay to stay with him and compounded his lies by accusing Miguel of running him down with his car and trying to kill him. Miguel was convicted in a sham trial and sentenced to life in prison without the possibility of parole; the judge was blackmailed by the same blackmailer Vincent, who was taking control of Theresa's life. Kay planned on telling Fox, from much urging by Miguel, that she is leaving him for Miguel. She tried once, but he pretended that he was asleep. But Julian Crane struck a deal with Kay; that he would get Miguel out of prison, if she stayed with Fox. Kay agreed and now she waits for Fox to die of his "terminal illness" so she can be with Miguel forever.

In June 2007, Kay accompanied Tabitha to another realm to rescue Tabitha's daughter Endora from two evil witches. They wanted to utilize Endora's powers for evil. The witches proved to be too much for Tabitha and Endora, and it looked as though they were going to lose. However, Kay used her love for her friends to summon the magical powers deep within her and vanquished the two evil witches. She was excited about her newly released powers and experimented with them, with disastrous results.

One evening, Fox caught Kay and Miguel and started to fight with him. Kay used her magical powers with the help of the demon elf she released when looking for her kidnapped sister Jessica. She saw that Fox had faked his illness and left him. She and Miguel then had a commitment ceremony. Kay's divorce from Fox was set to be finalized but was instead dissolved when he was murdered. Tragedy also ensued when Miguel found out the truth that Kay, Tabitha, and Endora were witches. The "Boys in the Basement" retaliated and kidnapped Endora. When Miguel tried to save her they were both sucked into another dimension. Both Kay and Tabitha tried to rescue Endora and Miguel by seeking them out in other dimensions but, to no avail. Both later received a ransom note from the "dark side" ordering the two witches to inflict Harmony with evil and misery or else never see their loved one's ever again. A desperate Tabitha went back to her evil ways much to Kay's reluctance. Kay also has become a main suspect in the murder of her late husband Fox, and has been falsely/wrongfully accused by Ivy of being a serial killer.

Both Kay and Miguel, and Tabitha and Endora were reunited on Christmas. Miguel made Kay and Tabitha both take a solemn oath never to do magic again, much to Tabitha's dismay. The newly acquainted couple also begin planning a double wedding with Miguel's sister Paloma Lopez-Fitzgerald, and Kay's brother Noah Bennett which eventually turned into a quad wedding with Miguel's brother Luis Lopez-Fitzgerald and Noah's ex-girlfriend Fancy Crane and Ethan Winthrop and Gwen Hotchkiss joining in. Kay and Miguel married on the July 21, 2008, episode. Miguel and Maria briefly traveled to another dimension in order for Kay to find a way to stop the disaster that was destined to destroy Harmony, but she was unsuccessful. When Tabitha prophesied that a volcano would destroy Harmony, Kay went to heaven and spoke to Timmy, who said that Tabitha had to become a Christian in order to save Harmony.

Supernatural incidents 
Although a Standish woman, Kay (seemingly) did not receive the Standish powers, however, in June 2007 Kay and Tabitha rescued Endora from evil witches who wanted to use her powers for evil Kay used her power of love, this is when Kay realized that she has received the Standish powers. When Tabitha was burnt at the stake by the testimony of Prudence Standish, Tabitha cursed all Standish descendants to die by fire (that prophecy which came true when Faith died in a fire and Grace who died in a bus that exploded) Tabitha also prophesied that one of the Standish descendants will use their powers for evil.

The prophecy came true in the form of Kay, whether she used her powers for good or evil, every spell she cast led to disaster, according to Tabitha; unlike Grace and Charity, Kay knows how to use her powers properly. Since Tabitha embraced goodness at the end of the series; it is very likely that the curse on the Standish descendants has been lifted.

See also 
Bennett and Standish families
Crane family
Lopez-Fitzgerald family

External links 

Female characters in television
Fictional housewives
Fictional witches
Passions characters
Television characters introduced in 1999